The Young Warriors may refer to:

The Young Warriors (film), a 1967 television film based on Richard Matheson's The Beardless Warriors
The Young Warriors (TV series), a 2006 Chinese television series